Novosphingobium oryzae  is a plant-promoting bacterium from the genus Novosphingobium.

References

External links
Type strain of Novosphingobium oryzae at BacDive -  the Bacterial Diversity Metadatabase

Bacteria described in 2016
Sphingomonadales